Saperda interrupta is a species of beetle in the family Cerambycidae. It was described by Gebler in 1825. It is known from China, Russia, Siberia, Korea and Japan. It is associated with coniferous plantations, and infests species of fir, pine, spruce and other conifers.

Varietas
 Saperda interrupta var. laterimaculata Motschoulsky, 1860
 Saperda interrupta var. biexcisa Plavilstshikov, 1931
 Saperda interrupta var. victori Plavilstshikov, 1931
 Saperda interrupta var. tranversefasciata Plavilstshikov, 1931
 Saperda interrupta var. subcandida Plavilstshikov, 1931

References

interrupta
Beetles described in 1825